Secrets of Women may refer to:

 Secrets of Women (film), a 1952 Swedish film
 Secrets of Women (TV series), a 2016 South Korean television series